Robert Bradley Haas (June 12, 1947 – September 28, 2021) was an American investor, photographer, and motorcycle collector.

Early life and education
Haas was born in Cleveland. He grew up there, but left home when he was a high school junior, moving to a rooming house. He received a Bachelor's degree in psychology from Yale University in 1969 and a degree in law from the Harvard University Law School in 1972.

Financial career
In 1984 he and Thomas Hicks formed the investment company Hicks & Haas in Dallas, Texas. Together, they purchased 49 percent of the soft drink companies 7-Up and Dr Pepper and then resold the combined companies in 1988 to Prudential-Bache Securities for $600 million. 

After Hicks & Haas dissolved in 1989, Haas co-founded Haas Wheat & Harrison in 1992 to focus on middle-market transactions.  Among his co-founders were Thomas Harrison, who had previously worked with Haas at Hicks & Haas and Douglas Wheat, a former investment banker with Donaldson, Lufkin & Jenrette.  

At the time of his death Haas was a senior adviser for New MainStream Capital, an investment firm.

Photography career
Haas took up photography in 1994 with no prior experience. After buying $2000 USD in camera gear, and learning how to use it, he did his first aerial photography from a helicopter on a Kenyan safari. He went on to work for National Geographic Magazine as a photographer for ten years, and to publish four coffee-table books on his aerial photography over Africa and Latin America.

Motorcycle collection
In 2012 Haas began collecting motorcycles. In 2018, he opened the Haas Moto Museum & Sculpture Gallery in Dallas to display the collection, which includes several custom-made motorcycles. He was the executive producer of the film Leaving Tracks, which documented his motorcycle collecting and profiled several custom motorcycle builders who contributed to his collection.

Books
Through the Eyes of the Gods, 2005
Through the Eyes of the Condor, 2007
Through The Eyes Of The Vikings, 2010
I dreamed of Flying like a Bird, 2010

References

1947 births
2021 deaths
Businesspeople from Cleveland
American investment bankers
20th-century American lawyers
21st-century American lawyers
Photographers from Ohio
20th-century American photographers
21st-century American photographers
Aerial photographers
National Geographic photographers
Nature photographers
Landscape photographers
American collectors
Museum founders
Yale University alumni
Harvard Law School alumni